Spectra may refer to:

 The plural of spectrum, conditions or values that vary over a continuum, especially the colours of visible light
 Spectra (journal), of the Museum Computer Network (MCN)
 The plural of spectrum (topology), an object representing a generalized cohomology theory in algebraic topology
 Spectra (mathematical association), an association of LGBT mathematicians
 Spectra (Latreille 1802), an order of stick-insects, or Phasmatodea

Companies and products 
 Kia Spectra, a car developed by Kia Motors from 2000 to the present.
 Motorola Spectra and Astro Spectra, models of two-way radio.
 Optare Spectra, a bus body built by Optare.
 Polaroid Spectra, a type of instant camera and instant film formerly produced by the Polaroid Corporation.
 RCA Spectra 70, the name for a series of mainframe computers made by RCA, and which were sold to Univac to become the Univac 90/60 series computer.
 Spectra, a brand of ultra-high-molecular-weight polyethylene fiber.
 Spectra Energy, an American company that was spun out of Duke Energy.
 SPECTRA helmet, a ballistic helmet made of Dyneema.
 Thales Spectra, an integrated defensive aids suite developed by Thales Group for the Dassault Rafale series of fighter aircraft.
 Spectra Group, a Bangladesh conglomerate. 
 Spectra Experiences, a venue management company.

Entertainment 
 Bantam Spectra, the science fiction/fantasy imprint of Bantam Books
 Sally Spectra, a fictional character on The Bold and the Beautiful
 Spectra (poetry collection), a 1916 American literary hoax
 Spectra Books, publishing imprint
 Spectra, a subsidiary of Comcast Spectacor, an American sports and entertainment company
 Spectra Phantom, a character from the TV series Bakugan Battle Brawlers: New Vestroia
 Spectra, the name of the enemy planet in the 1970s anime television series Battle of the Planets
 Spectra (installation), an artistic installation for the First World War centenary in London
 Spectra Vondergeist, a Monster High character
 Spectra, a video game published by Mastertronic Group and scored by Chipzel

See also 
 Spector (disambiguation) (includes Spektor)
 Spectre (disambiguation) (includes Specter)
 Spectrum (disambiguation)
 Specctra (auto-router)

Spectra BSC is a charity crypto token partnered with the National Autistic Society